Zelyony Gorod (lit. green city) is an urban locality (a resort settlement under the administrative jurisdiction of the city of oblast significance of Nizhny Novgorod) in Nizhny Novgorod Oblast, Russia, located in a forested area to the southeast of Nizhny Novgorod and surrounded by the territory of Kstovsky District. Population: 

The forested area around the settlement is a  surviving part of a much larger forest area that existed here centuries ago. Geographically, it is located
Nizhny Novgorod and Kstovo, and is bounded roughly by Highway M-7 and Pavlovo-Royka-Zeletsino railway from the north and the Kudma River in the south.

Many resort facilities and children's summer camps, originally built by the Soviet state or labor unions, are located in the settlement.

As of 2007, an upscale single-family housing development is being built on the southern outskirts of Zelyony Gorod (the Rassvet area), near the Kudma River.

References

Urban-type settlements in Nizhny Novgorod Oblast
Nizhny Novgorod Urban Okrug
Forests of Russia